The Golden Melody Award for Best Mandarin Album is an honor presented at the Golden Melody Awards, a ceremony that was established in 1990, to recording artists for quality Mandopop music albums.

The honor was first presented in 2005 as Best Mandarin Pop Vocal Album at the 16th Golden Melody Awards to Sandee Chan for Then We All Wept in Silence. In 2007, the category became known as Best Mandarin Album. Tanya Chua and Jay Chou currently hold the record for the most nominations, with six; followed by A-Mei with five.

Recipients

Category facts 
Most wins

Most nominations

References 

Golden Melody Awards
Album awards